This is a list of Greek football transfers for the 2017–18 winter transfer window by club. Only transfers of clubs in the Superleague and Football League are included.

The winter transfer window opened on 1 January 2018, although a few transfers took place prior to that date. The window closed at midnight on 1 February 2018. Players without a club may join one at any time, either during or in between transfer windows.

Superleague

AEK Athens

In:

Out:

Apollon Smyrni

In:

Out:

Asteras Tripoli

In:

Out:

Atromitos

In:

Out:

Kerkyra

In:

Out:

Lamia

In:

Out:

Larissa 

In:

Out:

Levadiakos

In:

Out:

Olympiacos

In:

Out:

Panathinaikos

In:

Out:

Panetolikos

In:

Out:

Panionios

In:

Out:

PAOK

In:

Out:

PAS Giannina

In:

Out:

Platanias

In:

Out:

Xanthi

In:

Out:

Football League

A.E. Karaiskakis

In:

Out:

Aiginiakos

In:

Out:

Anagennisi Karditsa

In:

Out:

AO Chania Kissamikos

In:

Out:

Apollon Larissa

In:

Out:

Apollon Pontou

In:

Out:

Aris

In:

Out:

Doxa Drama

In:

Out:

Ergotelis

In:

Out:

Kallithea

In:

Out:

OFI

In:

Out:

Panachaiki

In:

Out:

Panegialios

In:

Out:

Panserraikos

In:

Out:

Sparti

In:

Out:

Trikala

In:

Out:

Veria

In:

Out:

References

Greek
tran
2017-18